Iyibkhentre was an ancient Egyptian or Nubian ruler who most likely reigned at the end of the 11th and beginning of the 12th Dynasty.

Biography
He could have been a pretender to the Egyptian throne headquartered in Lower Nubia, during the politically sensitive period within the reign of Mentuhotep IV of the 11th Dynasty and the early reign of Amenemhat I of the 12th Dynasty. In fact, both those rulers seem to have had problems in being universally recognized as legitimate pharaohs.

Hungarian Egyptologist László Török suggested a much more recent dating for Iyibkhentre (as well as for the other related rulers mentioned below), some time after the reign of pharaoh Neferhotep I of the 13th Dynasty (Second Intermediate Period).

Iyibkhentre adopted the pharaonic royal titulary, although only the Horus name and the Throne name are known from rock inscriptions at Abu Hor, Mediq and Toshka, all in Lower Nubia.

Like Iyibkhentre, two other rulers based in Nubia, Segerseni and Qakare Ini, likely were pretenders to the Egyptian throne, but the eventual relationships among the trio are unknown.

References

Henri Gauthier, "Nouvelles remarques sur la XIe dynastie", BIFAO 9 (1911), pp. 99–136.

20th-century BC Pharaohs
People of the Eleventh Dynasty of Egypt
People of the Twelfth Dynasty of Egypt
Non-dynastic pharaohs
20th-century BC rulers
History of Nubia